John Kacherski (born June 27, 1967) is a former American football linebacker. He played for the Denver Broncos in 1992.

References

1967 births
Living people
American football linebackers
Ohio State Buckeyes football players
Denver Broncos players